The consensus 1973 College Basketball All-American team, as determined by aggregating the results of four major All-American teams.  To earn "consensus" status, a player must win honors from a majority of the following teams: the Associated Press, the USBWA, The United Press International and the National Association of Basketball Coaches.

1973 Consensus All-America team

Individual All-America teams

AP Honorable Mention:

 Alvan Adams, Oklahoma
 Bird Averitt, Pepperdine
 Marvin Barnes, Providence
 Ron Behagen, Minnesota
 Willie Biles, Tulsa
 Tom Burleson, NC State
 Jim Bradley, Northern Illinois
 Allan Bristow, Virginia Tech
 Krešimir Ćosić, BYU
 Steve Downing, Indiana
 Dennis DuVal, Syracuse
 Roy Ebron, Southwestern Louisiana
 Ozzie Edwards, Oklahoma City
 Larry Farmer, UCLA
 Larry Finch, Memphis State
 Elton Hayes, Lamar
 Larry Hollyfield, UCLA
 Allan Hornyak, Ohio State
 Wendell Hudson, Alabama
 Tom Ingelsby, Villanova
 Dwight Jones, Houston
 George Karl, North Carolina
 Larry Kenon, Memphis State
 Tom Kozelko, Toledo
 Kevin Kunnert, Iowa
 Raymond Lewis, Los Angeles State
 Patrick McFarland, Saint Joseph's
 Allie McGuire, Marquette
 Larry McNeill, Marquette
 Barry Parkhill, Virginia
 Marvin Rich, Oklahoma City
 Mike Robinson, Michigan State
 Don Smith, Dayton
 Phil Smith, San Francisco
 Aron Stewart, Richmond
 Martin Terry, Arkansas
 David Vaughn, Oral Roberts
 Nick Weatherspoon, Illinois
 Fly Williams, Austin Peay
 John Williamson, New Mexico State
 Henry Wilmore, Michigan

See also
 1972–73 NCAA University Division men's basketball season

References

NCAA Men's Basketball All-Americans
All-Americans